This is a list of main brands of pisco.

Chile

Compañía de las Cervecerías Unidas-owned
Espíritu de los Andes
Horcón Quemado
La Serena, named after the city of La Serena
Mistral, named after Gabriela Mistral a Chilean literature nobel laureate native to Elqui Valley 
Pisco Campanario 
Pisco Control
Pisco Control
Ruta Norte
Tres Erres

CAPEL owned
Alto del Carmen, named after the locality of Alto del Carmen
Pisco Capel, one of Chile's oldest pisco brands

Prohens
Malpaso

Other
Fundo los nichos, oldest pisco in chile, originally Tres Erres until the brand was sold to CCU, Pisco Bauza
Waqar, five generations of pisco maker

Peru 

BARSOL
Biondi
Bohórquez
Broggi
Cascajal
Cepas de Loro
Cortijo del Alto
Cuatro Gallos
De Carral
Del Macho
Don Alfredo
Don Benedicto
Don César
Don Isidoro
Don Saturnino
Don Zacarías
DonBerly
E. Copello Puro
El Alambique
El Almendral
El Monitor
El Sarcay de Azpitia
El Viejo Parral
Ferreyros
Fontana Pisco
Fundo Real
Gran Cruz
GRAN SIERPE
Grimaldi
Guacamayo
La Caravedo
La Diablada
Los Nichos
Lovera
Miski
Mongess
Monteluz
Montesierpe
Ocucaje
Pancho Fierro Acholado
Payet
Paz Soldán
Pisco 100 Perfectly Peruvian 
Pisco Huamaní
Pisco Portón
Piscología 
Poblete
Pozo Santo
Queirolo
Rajaz Pisco 
Reinoso
Rivadeneyra
Soldeica
Sotelo
Tacama Demonio de Los Andes
Tradición
Tres Generaciones
Viejo Porrón
Viejo Tonel Black
Viñas de Oro

Other countries

Don Quixote Distillery - United States
Harmans Estate, Margaret River, Western Australia
Leopold Bros. - United States

References

Brandies
Lists of brand name drinks